Ibrahim Sabawi Ibrahim (October 25, 1983  - May 20, 2015, Baghdad) was Saddam Hussein's half-nephew and an ISIL guerrilla.

Ibrahim's father was Sabawi Ibrahim Hassan al-Tikriti, Saddam's half-brother, the 'Six of Diamonds' in the U.S. 'Most Wanted' playing card deck due to his leading Iraqi secret intelligence. Sabawi Ibrahim Hassan al-Tikriti and at least two sons (Ibrahim Sabawi Ibrahim and his older brother, Ayman Sabawi Ibrahim) were captured by Iraqi and coalition forces near Saddam's hometown of Tikrit in February, 2005. Ibrahim Sabawi Ibrahim escaped from a prison near Mosul the following year while serving sentences for illegal weapons possession and the manufacture of explosive devices used in terror attacks.  His father died from cancer in a Baghdad hospital in 2013.

Death
Iraqi media, on authority of the Baath party and ISIS supporters, reported Ibrahim Sabawi Ibrahim having been killed in a battle between Iraqi military forces and Iranian-backed Shiite militias in or near the contested oil refinery at Baiji, Iraq, on May 20, 2015.

References

1981 births
Iraqi people of Arab descent
Tulfah family
Iraqi Sunni Muslims
2015 deaths